The Stargate Asterism or Stargate Cluster is an asterism in the constellation Corvus consisting of six stars, also known as STF 1659. The stars form vertices of two nested triangles, resembling a portal device featured in the Buck Rogers science fiction TV series.

Gallery

See also 
 Lists of stars

References 

Asterisms (astronomy)